Pachymelania is a genus of freshwater snails, gastropod mollusks in the family Hemisinidae.

Species
Species within the genus Pachymelania include:

 Pachymelania aurita (O. F. Müller, 1774)
 Pachymelania byronensis Gray
 Pachymelania fusca (Gmelin, 1790)

References

External links

Hemisinidae